The Pan Pagan Festival (PPF) is one of the United States's first and longest running nature spirituality festivals, organized by the Midwest Pagan Council that spans from Wednesday through Sunday in late July or early August each year. The first Pan Pagan festival was held in 1976 as a way of bringing different groups together to share knowledge and experience. The festival grew each year until 1980 which was the largest Pagan gathering ever held up to that time, with an attendance of almost 600, including Raymond Buckland, Isaac Bonewits, Z Budapest, Herman Slater, Prudence Priest, Margot Adler, and Selena Fox. From the Pan Pagan Festival other festivals grew including Circle's Pagan Spirit Gathering and Chrysalis Moon.

Rituals and events
There are three rituals that are perennial to the Pan Pagan Festival:
 Opening Ritual — Wednesday afternoon
 Main Ritual — Saturday evening
 Closing Rituals — Sunday afternoon

PPF caters to people of all ages, with activities ranging from crafts and scavenger hunts for children, teens, and young elders, to workshops on herbs, crystals, and home remedies. Regular events include:
 Opening Ritual, the only thing scheduled for Wednesday, to give attendees time to arrive and relax as they set up their tents and settle in.
 Town Meeting, held every morning of the fest.
 Meet & Greet, held Thursday night; everyone introduces themselves, the council supplies limited amounts of beer, wine, and soda as well as snacks to encourage mingling.
 The Annual Duck Races, held Friday morning.
 The Follies, a talent show held Friday night.
 Scavenger Hunt for kids, held Saturday morning, with prizes.
 Auction & Raffle, Saturday late afternoon; each vendor is asked to donate one item from their shop, and other attendees may donate items as well. All money raised goes to the MPC to help offset the costs of holding next year's PPF.
 Feast, held Saturday night, the council supplies an assortment of food.
 Main Ritual, Saturday night, ending with a bonfire; drumming and dancing take place after the bonfire has been lit.
 Closing Ritual, held Sunday afternoon.

Locations and themes
Each year Pan Pagan Festival has a theme, which helps to give coherence to artwork and activities.
 PPF 2022 held at a campground near French Lick, IN — Out of the Darkness, Into the Light
 PPF 2021 held virtually as a one-day festival
 PPF 44 (2020) postponed due to Pandemic
 PPF 43 (2019) held at a campground near Knox, IN — Magick Happens
 PPF 42 (2018) held at a campground near Knox, IN — Walking the Path of the Ancients
 PPF 41 (2017) held at a campground near Knox, IN — The Beat goes On and On
 PPF 40 (2016) held at a campground near Knox, IN — Changing, Growing, Renewing
 PPF 39 (2015) held at a campground near Knox, IN — Open Spirits, Open Hearts
 PPF 38 (2014) held at a campground near Knox, IN — Bringing Old and New Together
 PPF 37 (2013) held at a campground near Knox, IN — An Elemental Connection
 PPF 36 (2012) held at a campground near Knox, IN — Creating Sacred Spaces
 PPF 35 (2011) held at a campground near Knox, IN — Dancing with Pan
 PPF 34 (2010) held at a campground near Knox, IN — Sharing Traditions, As One!
 PPF 33 (2009) held at a campground near Knox, IN — Community Starts Here!
 PPF 32 (2008) held at a campground near Knox, IN — Share The Labor, Share The Love!
 PPF 31 (2007) held at a campground near Knox, IN — Around The Wheel & Back Again
 PPF 30 (2006) held at a campground near Knox, IN — 30 Years Of Growth
 PPF 29 (2005) held at a campground near Knox, IN — Strength Through Diversity
 PPF 28 (2004) held at a campground near Knox, IN — Unity Through Diversity
 PPF 27 (2003) held at 3-D Campground in Indiana — We Make A Bountiful Harvest
 PPF 26 (2002) held at 3-D Campground in Indiana — Caretakers Of The Garden
 PPF 25 (2001) held at 3-D Campground in Indiana — 25 Magickal Years
 PPF 24 (2000) held at 3-D Campground in Indiana — Flowing Forever Forward
 PPF 23 (1999) held at 3-D Campground in Indiana — We Dream The Future
 PPF 22 (1998) held at MPC Land in Indiana — Harmony Through Family
 PPF-21 (1997) held at MPC Land in Indiana — From The Goddess Into Our Care, This Land Is Ours
 PPF-20 (1996) held at Timber Trails Campground in Indiana — Making Pagan History
 PPF 19 (1995) held at Timber Trails Campground in Indiana — We Make The Magick Come Alive
 PPF 18 (1994) held at Timber Trails Campground in Indiana — Realize A Bright Tomorrow Thru Our Ties With The Past
 PPF 17 (1993) held at Timber Trails Campground in Indiana — From Times Beginning To Times End, Our Circles Always Blend
 PPF 16 (1992) held at Timber Trails Campground in Indiana — Blossoming Forth With Love
 PPF 15 (1991) held at Timber Trails Campground in Indiana — Regenerated And Growing Anew
 PPF 14 (1990) held at Campground in Yorkville, Illinois — To/Gather, Again
 PPF 13 (1989) held at Circle Pines in Kalamazoo, Michigan
 PPF 12 (1988) held at Circle Pines in Kalamazoo, Michigan
 PPF 11 (1987) held at Lake Eliza in Indiana
 PPF 10 (1986) held at Lake Eliza in Indiana — We've Come A Long Way Lady, 10 Years Young And Growing PPF 9 (1985) held at Lake Eliza in Indiana — Life Is Unity Is Life''

Notes

External links
 

Modern paganism in the United States
Modern pagan festivals
1970s in modern paganism